Hedda Gabler is a play written by Norwegian playwright Henrik Ibsen. Published in 1890, it has been the subject of many film and television adaptations, including:

 Hedda Gabler (1917), silent film, United States
 Hedda Gabler (1920), silent film, Italy
 Hedda Gabler (1925), silent film, Germany, starring Asta Nielsen
 A live production of Hedda Gabler, condensed to one hour, was presented on television in 1954 on The United States Steel Hour
 Hedda Gabler (1957), United Kingdom, televised play
 Hedda Gabler (1961 film), Yugoslavia
 Hedda Gabler (1961 TV production), Australia
  (1963 TV film), Germany, starring Ruth Leuwerik
 Hedda Gabler (1963 film), United States TV film, starring Ingrid Bergman.
 Hedda Gabler (1963), United Kingdom TV production, BBC
 Hedda Gabler (1972), United Kingdom TV film
 Hedda Gabler (1975 film), Norway
 Hedda (1975), United Kingdom, film starring Glenda Jackson
 Hedda Gabler (1978 film), Belgium
 Hedda Gabler (1979 film), Italy
 Hedda Gabler (1980 television production) starring Diana Rigg
 Hedda Gabler (1981 film), United Kingdom
 Hedda Gabler (1984 film), Belgium
 Hedda Gabler (1993 film), Sweden
 Hedda Gabler (1993), TV broadcast of a National Theatre production, starring Fiona Shaw
 Hedda Gabler (2004 film), United States
 Hedda Gabler (2014 film), starring Rita Ramnani

References

Filmographies